Tathan "Tate"  Martell (born January 26, 1998) is a former American football player. He played mainly as a quarterback for the UNLV Rebels and Ohio State, as well as quarterback & wide receiver at the University of Miami.

Early life
Tathan Martell grew up in the San Diego area, where he began playing Pop Warner football at the age of 7. He drew attention due to the fact that he was a throwing quarterback, when most kids at that age were running quarterbacks. He even drew attention of the coach of Washington at the time, Steve Sarkisian, whom Martell originally committed to play college football for.

High school career
Martell first attended Poway High School, his hometown high school, but was only able to lead them to a 4–7 season. He then transferred to Bishop Gorman High School in Las Vegas, Nevada. He attended Bishop Gorman to succeed the quarterback play of Randall Cunningham II for his sophomore, junior and senior seasons, but graduated from Desert Pines High School in Las Vegas because Bishop Gorman would not allow Martell to graduate early in order to start the spring semester at Ohio State University. As a senior, he was the Gatorade Football Player of the Year after leading the team to a 15–0 record, while passing for 2,362 yards and 41 touchdowns, and rushing for 1,253 yards and 21 touchdowns. For his career, after transferring to Bishop Gorman, Martell went 45–0 as a starter and finished second in Nevada history with 7,510 passing yards and 113 touchdowns. Martell and quarterbacks Jake Fromm and Tayvon Bowers were documented in the Netflix series QB1: Beyond the Lights.

Recruiting
Martell was rated by Scout.com as a five-star recruit and was ranked as the second best dual-threat quarterback, fifth best quarterback of any type, and 56th best player overall in his class. He originally committed to the University of Washington when he was 14. In 2015, he changed his commitment to Texas A&M University. In May 2016 he decommitted from A&M and a month later committed to Ohio State University.

College career

Ohio State
Martell redshirted his true freshman season at Ohio State in 2017. As a redshirt freshman in 2018, Martell battled for the starting role in spring camp but ultimately served as the backup to Dwayne Haskins. In Ohio State's opener against Oregon State, Martell completed three passes for 33 yards on four attempts. The next week against Rutgers, Martell secured his first career touchdown via a 51-yard pass to Terry McLaurin, his first-and-only touchdown pass as a college quarterback; as well as a 47-yard touchdown run. Martell appeared in six games for the Buckeyes in 2018, finishing with 269 passing yards, one passing touchdown, 128 rushing yards, and two rushing touchdowns.

In January 2019, Georgia quarterback Justin Fields announced his intention to transfer to Ohio State, prompting Martell to tweet, "Word of advice: don't swing and miss...especially not your second time." Prior to this, on December 30, 2018—upon word that Fields was giving thought to transferring to Ohio State—Martell stated, "Why would I leave for someone who hasn't put in a single second into this program? To just run away from somebody who hasn't put a single second into workouts anything like that and doesn't know what the program is all about, there's not a chance. I will [be the starting quarterback]. I am 100 percent sure on that. I am not just going to walk away from something that I have put so much time into and there is not a chance that I won't go out there and compete for that."  Less than two weeks later, on January 10, Martell chose to enter the NCAA transfer portal.

Miami
On January 15, 2019, Martell announced on social media that he would be transferring from Ohio State to Miami. Martell, who would normally have to sit out one year due to NCAA transfer rules, sought a hardship waiver in order to be immediately eligible, citing Ohio State's coaching change from Urban Meyer to Ryan Day. On March 19, 2019, Martell was granted a waiver by the NCAA and was eligible to play for Miami in 2019. On August 12, 2019, it was announced via the Miami Football Twitter account that redshirt freshman Jarren Williams had beaten out Martell for the starting quarterback job. He then switched to wide receiver, then switched back to quarterback. In September 2020, Martell opted out of the 2020 season after having been suspended to start the year.

UNLV
On July 26, 2021, it was announced that Martell would be transferring to UNLV. He appeared in only two games with one pass attempt during the 2021 season due to injury.

On January 18, 2022, Martell announced he was retiring from football.

College football statistics

References

External links
Miami Hurricanes bio
Ohio State Buckeyes bio
UNLV Rebels bio

1998 births
Living people
Players of American football from Nevada
American football quarterbacks
Bishop Gorman High School alumni
Miami Hurricanes football players
Ohio State Buckeyes football players
UNLV Rebels football players